Czech declension is a complex system of grammatically determined modifications of nouns, adjectives, pronouns and numerals in Czech, one of the Slavic languages. Czech has seven cases: nominative, genitive, dative, accusative, vocative, locative and instrumental, partly inherited from Proto-Indo-European and Proto-Slavic. Some forms of words match in more than one place in each paradigm.

Nouns 

There are 14 paradigms of noun declension.  The paradigm of nominal declension depends on the gender and the ending in the nominative of the noun.

In Czech the letters d, h, ch, k, n, r and t are considered 'hard' consonants and č, ř, š, ž, c, j, ď, ť, and ň are considered 'soft'. Others are ambiguous, so nouns ending in b, f, l, m, p, s, v and z may take either form.

For nouns in which the stem ends with a consonant group, a floating e is usually inserted between the last two consonants in cases with no ending. Examples:
zámek (N sg, A sg), zámku (G sg, D sg, V sg, L sg), zámkem (I sg), etc. (chateau; lock) – paradigm hrad
karta (N sg), ..., karet (G pl) (card) – paradigm žena

Consonant or vowel alternations in the word-stem are also obvious in some cases, e.g. zámek (N sg) → zámcích (L pl), Věra (N sg) → Věře (D sg), kniha (N sg) → knize (D sg), moucha (N sg) → mouše (D sg), hoch (N sg) → hoši  (N pl), kluk (N sg) → kluci (N pl), bůh (N sg) → bozích (L pl), kolega (N sg) → kolezích (L pl), moucha (N sg) → much  (G pl), smlouva (N sg) → smluv (G pl), díra (N sg) → děr (G pl), víra (N sg) → věr (G pl), kráva (N sg) → krav (G pl), dvůr (N sg) → dvora (G sg), hnůj (N sg) → hnoje (G sg), sůl (N sg) → soli (G sg), lest (N sg) → lsti  (G sg), čest (N sg) → cti (G sg), křest (N sg) → křtu (G sg), mistr (N sg) → mistře (V sg), švec (N sg) → ševce (G sg). See Czech phonology for more details.

Masculine animate

pán – sir, lord; kluk – boy; host – guest; manžel – husband; muž – man; kůň – horse; učitel – teacher; otec – father; předseda – chairman; turista – tourist; cyklista – cyclist; kolega – colleague; soudce – judge; mluvčí -speaker, spokesman

Masculine inanimate

hrad – castle; les – forest; zámek – chateau, lock; stroj – machine

Latin words ending -us are declined according to the paradigm pán (animate) or hrad (inanimate) as if there were no -us ending in the nominative: Brutus, Bruta, Brutovi, Bruta, Brute, Brutovi, Brutem

 Feminine žena – woman; škola – school; husa – goose; ulice – street; růže – rose; píseň – song; postel – bed; dveře – door; kost – bone; ves – village Neuter město – town; jablko – apple; moře – sea; letiště – airport; kuře – chicken; stavení – building, house; Latin words ending -um are declined according to the paradigm město: muzeum, muzea, muzeu, muzeum ...Irregular nouns 

The parts of the body have irregular, originally dual, declension, especially in the plural forms, but only when used to refer to the parts of the body and not in metaphorical contexts. For example, when "noha" (leg) is used to refer to the part of the body, it declines as below, but when used to refer to a leg on a chair or table, it declines regularly (according to žena).oko – eye, ucho – ear, rameno – shoulder, koleno – knee, ruka – hand/arm, noha – foot/leg.bůh – god, člověk – person, lidé – people, obyvatel – resident, přítel – friendSubmodels of feminine declensiondcera – daughter, ulice – streetSubmodels of neuter declensionvejce – egg, letiště – airportOther cases of special inflectionloket – elbow, dvůr – courtyard, čest – honour, zeď – wall, loď – boat Adjective 

Adjective declension varies according to the gender of the noun which they are related to:mladý muž (male) –  young manmladá žena (female) – young womanmladé víno (neuter) – new wine, mustum

 Hard declension mladý – young Soft declension jarní – spring, vernal Possessive adjectives 

Possessive adjectives are formed from animate singular nouns (masculine and feminine):
otec (father) -> otcův (father's)
matka (mother) -> matčin (mother's)

Examples:otcův dům – father's housematčino auto – mother's car

Possessive adjectives are often used in the names of streets, squares, buildings, etc.:Neruda -> Nerudova ulice (Neruda street)

but:Jan Neruda -> ulice Jana Nerudy (noun genitive)partyzáni (partisans, guerilla) -> ulice PartyzánůComparisons

The comparative is formed by the suffix -ejší, -ější, -ší, or -í (there is no simple rule which suffix should be used).

The superlative is formed by adding the prefix nej- to the comparative.

Examples:krásný – krásnější – nejkrásnější (beautiful – more beautiful – the most beautiful)hladký – hladší – nejhladší (smooth – smoother – the smoothest)tenký – tenčí – nejtenčí (slim – slimmer – the slimmest)snadný – snazší, snadnější – nejsnazší, nejsnadnější (easy – easier – the easiest)zadní – zazší, zadnější – nejzazší, nejzadnější (posterior – more posterior – the most posterior)úzký – užší – nejužší (narrow – narrower – the narrowest)měkký – měkčí – nejměkčí (soft – softer – the softest)

The comparative and the superlative can be also formed by the words více (more)/méně (less) and nejvíce (most)/nejméně (least):spokojený – více/méně spokojený – nejvíce/nejméně spokojený (satisfied – more/less satisfied – the most/least satisfied)

Irregular comparisons:dobrý – lepší – nejlepší (good – better – the best)zlý/špatný – horší – nejhorší (ill/bad – worse – the worst)velký – větší – největší (big – bigger – the biggest)malý – menší – nejmenší (small/little – smaller/less – the smallest/least)dlouhý – delší – nejdelší (long – longer – the longest)svatý – světější – nejsvětější (holy – holier – the holiest)bílý – bělejší – nejbělejší (white – whiter – the whitest)

Short forms

There are also short forms in some adjectives. They are used in the nominative and are regarded as literary in the contemporary language. They are related to active and passive participles. (See Czech verb)

Example:On je ještě příliš mlád. = On je ještě příliš mladý. (He is still too young.)Rád is used in a short form only: Jsem rád, že jste přišli. (I am glad that you came.)

Pronouns

Pronoun declension is complicated, some are declined according to adjective paradigms, some are irregular.

Personal pronouns

In some singular cases, short forms of pronouns are possible, which are clitics. They cannot be used with prepositions. They are unstressed, therefore they cannot be the first words in sentences. Usually they appear in second place in a sentence or clause, obeying Wackernagel's Law. Examples:Nedávej mi to. Don't give it to me.Mně to nedávej. Don't give it to me. (emphasizing mně)Přijď ke mně. Come to me.

In 3rd person (singular and plural) j-forms are used without prepositions, n-forms are used after prepositions:Ukaž mu to. or Ukaž to jemu. (emphasizing jemu) Show it to him.Přišla k němu. She came to him.

Accusative forms jej (on), je, ně (ono) are usually regarded as archaic.

They: oni – masculine animate gender, ony – masculine inanimate and feminine genders, ona – neuter gender

Reflexive personal pronoun

Reflexive personal pronoun is used when the object is identical to the subject. It has no nominative form and it is the same for all persons and numbers. It is translated into English as myself, yourself, himself, etc.

Example:Vidím se (sebe) v zrcadle. I see myself in the mirror.

Short form se and si are again clitics; often they are a part of reflexive verbs and as such are not usually translated into English explicitly:Posaď se./Sedni si. Sit down.

Possessive pronouns

Můj – my
Tvůj – your

Jeho – his, its
This pronoun is indeclinable.

Její – her

Náš – our
Váš – your

Jejich – their
This pronoun is indeclinable.

Reflexive possessive pronoun

The reflexive possessive pronoun is used when the possessor is also the subject (my own, your own, etc.). It is identical for all persons.

Examples:Vidím svého otce. I see my father.Vidíš svého otce. You see your father.

Compare:On vidí svého otce. He sees his father. (his own father)On vidí jeho otce. He sees his father. (the father of someone else)

Demonstrative pronouns

Ten – the, this, that

Tenhle, tahle, tohle/tento, tato, toto (this) and tamten, tamta, tamto (that) are declined as ten + to (tento, tohoto, tomuto ...), resp. tam + ten (tamten, tamtoho, tamtomu ...).Onen, ona, ono (that – not to be confused with personal pronouns) is declined as ten (onen, onoho, onomu ...).

To is often used as personal pronoun instead of ono (it):Dej mi to. Give it to me."To je/jsou" means "this is/these are" and is used for all genders and both numbers:To je můj přítel. This is my friend. (Přítel is masculine.)To jsou mí přátelé. These are my friends.

Interrogative and relative pronouns

Kdo – who
Co – what

Který – which, who
declined as mladýJaký – what, what kind, what type
declined as mladýCompare:Co je to? What is it/this?Jaké je to? What is it like, what kind is it, what type is it?

Čí – whose
declined as jarníJenž – which, who

Jenž is not an interrogative pronoun, it is equivalent to který (as a relative pronoun):Vidím muže, který/jenž právě přichází. I can see a man who is just coming.

Indefinite and negative pronouns

někdo, kdos(i) (old) – somebody, someone
nikdo – nobody, no one
kdokoli(v) – anyone
leckdo(s), leda(s)kdo, kdekdo – many people, frequently/commonly someone
declined like kdo (někdo, někoho, někomu, …; nikdo, nikoho, nikomu, …; kdokoli, kohokoli, komukoli, …; leckdo, leckoho, leckomu, …)

něco – something
nic – nothing
cokoli(v) – anything
lecco(s), ledaco(s), leda(s)co, kdeco – many things, frequently/commonly something
declined like co (něco, něčeho, něčemu, …; nic, ničeho, ničemu, …; cokoli, čehokoli, čemukoli, …; lecos, lecčeho, lecčemu, …)

někde – somewhere
nikde – nowhere
kdekoli(v) – anywhere
všude – everywhere; less frequently: any path/direction/trajectory
leckde, leda(s)kde – on many/frequent/common places, wherever
někudy, kudysi (old) – some path/direction/trajectory
nikudy – no path/direction/trajectory
kdekudy – any path/direction/trajectory
odněkud, odkudsi (old) – from somewhere
odnikud – from nowhere
odevšad – from everywhere/every direction/every angle
kdesi (old) – somewhere more specific
not declined

všelijak – in all ways
nějak, jaksi (old) – somehow (colloquial tak nějak – in a way, somewhat, quite, rather)
nijak, nikterak (old) – in no way
jakkoli(v), kdejak (old) – in any way, anyhow
not declined

každý – each, each one
nějaký – some, one, a(n)
některý – some, particular, selected (little more specific than nějaký)
kterýsi (old), jakýsi (old) – some, someone (more specific)
žádný – none, no (as in "no man has ever been there")
nijaký – no whatsoever; of no properties (specifically)
jakýkoli(v), kterýkoli – any
lecjaký, leda(s)jaký, kdejaký, kdekterý – frequently/commonly some, whichever
všelijaký – getting many forms, various
veškerý – entire, total, all
declined like mladýněčí, čísi (old) – belonging to someone or something
ničí – belonging to no one or nothing
číkoli – belonging to any one or anything
lecčí, leda(s)čí, kdečí – belonging to many or frequent/common number of owners, whosever
declined like jarníExample: –„Tam se asi nikdo nedostane.‟ –„Ne, tam přijímají ledaskoho. Leckdy i se špatnými známkami. Skoro každý se tam dostane, ať už jakkoli, ale ne jen tak kdokoli dokončí studia.‟ (–"I guess no one gets there." –"No, they admit many people there. In many cases/frequently/commonly even with bad marks. Almost everyone gets there, no matter how, but not just anyone will finish the studies.")

Czech grammar allows more than one negative word to exist in a sentence. For example: „Tady nikde nikdy nikdo nijak odnikud nikam nepostoupí.‟, standing for: "Anywhere around here, no one will ever progress from any place anywhere in any way." (literally, word by word: "Here nowhere never nobody no way anywhence anywhere won't progress."), uses six negatives in adverbs and pronouns and one at verb while still being grammatically correct. It uses negative form in questions, expressing doubts, wishes, asking for favours, etc. like, for example: „Neměl bys být už ve škole?!‟ ("Shouldn't you be at school already?!"); „Neměl byste na mě pár minut čas?‟ ("Wouldn't you have few minutes of Your time for me?"); „Nemáš náhodou papír a tužku?‟ ("Don't you, by chance, happen to have a paper and some pencil?"); „Přišel jsem se tě zeptat, jestli bychom si nemohli vyměnit směny.‟ ("I came to ask if we could not swap our shifts.")

 Prepositions with certain cases 

Czech prepositions are matched with certain cases of nouns. They are usually not matched with the nominative case, which is primarily used as the subject in sentences. However, there are some exceptions to this rule: foreign prepositions (kontra, versus, etc.) are matched with the nominative, but their use is very rare. No prepositions are matched with the vocative, because it is used for addressing people only.

Genitive:
během – during, while, through the course of (e.g. během prázdnin – during the holidays)
bez – without (e.g. bez dcerky neodejdu – I won't go without my daughter)
do – in; to (e.g. dej to do krabice – put it in a box; jít do bytu – to go into a flat); until (e.g. čekat do tří – to wait until 3:00)
kolem – around (e.g. chodil kolem rybníka – he was walking around the pond)
krom(ě), vedle – except, besides (e.g. kromě něj tam byla i ona – besides him, she was there too)
(na)místo – instead of (e.g. místo tebe hrál náhradník – a substitute played instead of you)
od – from, since, as of (e.g. od listopadu jsem volný – I'm free from/as of November; dopis od mé matky – a letter from my mother)
ohledně – regarding
okolo – about, around, circa/roughly (e.g. tráva okolo studny – grass around the well; bylo jich okolo stovky – there were about 100 of them)
podél – along
(po)dle – according to (e.g. podle normy – according to norm)
pomocí – with the help of; using (e.g. pomocí klacku ho dostali z bažiny – with a help of a stick they got him out of a marsh)
prostřednictvím – through; with a help/device/instrument of; utilizing; using … as intermediate/liaison
s – from higher place to lower (obsolete) (e.g. sebral hračku s poličky – he took the toy from the shelf)
stran – from the point of view of; because of; regarding (rare)
u – by, next to, at (e.g. vchod u rohu – entrance at the corner; u stolu – at/around the table, jsem u tebe – I'm at your house)
vedle – next to, besides (e.g. na té fotce stojí Lucie vedle Moniky – in the photo, Lucie is standing next to Monika)
vlivem – due to, because of, for, through the influence of (e.g. vlivem bouřky jsme se nemohli dívat na televizi – because of the storm we couldn't watch TV)
vyjma – except for, excluding (e.g. vyjma tebe všichni souhlasí – everyone agrees except for you; less frequent)
využitím – using (e.g. využitím slevy si to mohla koupit – using a discount, she was able to buy it)
z – from, out of (e.g. kouř z komínu – smoke out of a chimney)

Dative:
díky – thanks to (e.g. díky němu máme naše peníze zpět – thanks to him, we have our money back), note: used only if the cause is positive or beneficial, otherwise kvůli or vlivem is used
k – to(wards) (e.g. jedeme k jezeru – we're going to(wards) the lake, jdu k tobě – i'm coming to your house; přijedeme ke konci července – we are going to come towards the end of July)
kvůli – due to, because of, for, through the influence of (e.g. udělej to kvůli mě – do it for me; udělal to kvůli mě – he did it because of me)
(na)proti – against, opposite to (e.g. je proti tobě – (s) he's against you; je to naproti lékárně – it's opposite to the pharmacy)
oproti – opposite to, unlike, to the contrary to (e.g. oproti teoriím věřím faktům – unlike the theories, I believe the facts)
vůči – in the face of, toward(s) (e.g laskavost vůči někomu – kindness towards someone; porovnej to vůči originálu – compare it with the original)

Accusative:
pro – for (e.g. udělal to pro mě – he did/made it for me)
za – for (less frequent); instead of; behind (direction); per (e.g. za vlast – for the country; 1 porce za 5 korun – 1 portion for 5 crowns; vyměnil ji za mladší – he switched her for a younger one; běhala za plot – she ran behind a fence)
před – in front of (direction) (e.g. vyvěs to před dům – (go) hang it in front of the house)
mimo – aside from, besides, off, out of, parallel to (place) (e.g. mimo Prahu – outside of Prague; mimo terč – off the bullet; mimo provoz – out of order; mimo – out/miss/no hit; mimo jiné – besides other things)
na – (on)to (direction) (e.g. dej to na stůl – put it on the table; na vánoce zůstaneme doma – at Christmas we will stay at home)
pod – under, below (direction)
nad – over, above (direction) (e.g. dej ten kříž nade dveře – put the cross above the door; nad tebe není – no one is better than you)
mezi – between, among (direction) (e.g. dali ho mezi ostatní – they put him among the others)
skrz – through (e.g. šíp prošel skrze jablko – the arrow went through the apple; jsem tu skrz tu stížnost – I'm here regarding the complaint)
o – by, for (e.g. zvýšit o 1 – increase by one; zápas o 3. místo – match for the 3rd place)
v – in (e.g. věřit v boha – to believe in God)

Locative:
o – about, of (e.g. mluvit o ní – to talk about her)
na – on (e.g. skvrna na sukni – stain on a skirt)
v – in (e.g. ruka v rukávu – arm in a sleeve)
po – after (e.g. po obědě – after lunch; jdu po čáře – I walk the line)
při – by; during (e.g. při obřadu – during the ceremonial; stůj při mně – stand by me/be my support)

Instrumental:
s – with (e.g. s tebou – with you)
za – behind, beyond, after (place), in/after (time); (e.g. stát za rohem – to stand behind the corner; kdo za tím je? – who's behind (it)?/what's the meritum?; za horizontem – beyond the horizon)
před – in front of (place); before; ago; from; against (e.g. přímo před tebou – right in front of you; před mnoha lety – many years ago; uniknout před pronásledovateli – to escape from pursuers; varovat před ním – to warn against him)
pod – under(neath), below (place) (e.g. pod stolem spí pes – a dog is sleeping under the table)
nad – over, above (place)
mezi – between, among (place) (e.g. mezi póly – between poles; mezi kuřaty – among chicken)

 Plural forms 

Like other Slavic languages, Czech distinguishes two different plural forms in the nominative case. For numbers 2 to 4 or in cases where the quantity of the plural noun is not defined in any way, the nominative plural form is used. For higher numbers or when used with a quantifying adjective, the genitive form is used, and any following verb will be neuter singular. This declension applies to nouns and adjectives.

(dlouhý – long, hodina – hour, pár – a few; a pair)

Gender and number of compound phrases
In the case of a compound noun phrase (coordinate structure), of the form "X and Y", "X, Y and Z", etc., the following rules for gender and number apply:
When any of the components is masculine animate, the whole compound is masculine animate plural.
If every component is neuter plural, the whole compound is neuter plural.
In other cases (no masculine animate component, and at least one component which is not neuter plural), the whole compound is feminine/masculine inanimate plural (the feminine and the masculine inanimate forms of verbs and adjectives are identical in the plural).

However:
If the verb precedes the compound subject, it may agree either with the subject as a whole (according to the above rules) or with the first component of the subject.
When the compound is formed using s ("with") rather than a ("and"), the verb or predicate may agree with the first component (the part before s) or with the subject as a whole (according to the above rules).
When coordinated adjectives are applied to a singular noun (as in česká a německá strana, "the Czech and German sides", literally "side"), the whole may be treated as either singular or plural (but singular is preferred in the case of abstract nouns).

For further description (in Czech) and example sentences, see the Institute of the Czech Language source listed below.

 Sources 
KARLÍK, P.; NEKULA, M.; RUSÍNOVÁ, Z. (eds.). Příruční mluvnice češtiny. Praha: Nakladelství Lidové noviny, 1995. .
ŠAUR, Vladimír. Pravidla českého pravopisu s výkladem mluvnice.'' Praha: Ottovo nakladatelství, 2004. .
Shoda přísudku s podmětem několikanásobným, on the website of the Institute of the Czech Language of the Academy of Sciences of the Czech Republic

See also 

 Czech conjugation
 Czech language
 Czech alphabet
 Czech name
 Czech orthography

Declension
Czech grammar